Kani Sefid or Kani Safid may refer to various places in Iran:
 Kani Sefid, Divandarreh, Kurdistan Province
 Kani Sefid, Karaftu, Divandarreh County, Kurdistan Province
 Kani Sefid, Marivan, Kurdistan Province
 Kani Sefid, Saqqez, Kurdistan Province
 Kani Sefid, Mahabad, West Azerbaijan Province
 Kani Sefid, Salmas, West Azerbaijan Province
 Kani Sefid, Urmia, West Azerbaijan Province